Alex Fernández (born 22 January 1970) is a retired Colombian football defender.

He was born in Medellín. He spent the main part of his career in Independiente Medellín from 1990 through 1999, except spells in Deportes Tolima in 1993 and Deportivo Cali in 1996–97. He then played for Millonarios F.C. from 1999 to 2001 and Deportes Quindío from 2001 to 2003.

He was capped for Colombia national football team, including at the 1995 Copa América. Your son is a footballer Bryan Fernández.

References

1970 births
Living people
Association football defenders
Colombian footballers
Colombia international footballers
1995 Copa América players
Independiente Medellín footballers
Deportes Tolima footballers
Deportivo Cali footballers
Millonarios F.C. players
Deportes Quindío footballers
Footballers from Medellín